Old Tbilisi (dzveli t'bilisi) was an administrative district (raioni) in Tbilisi, capital of Georgia, from 2007 to 2013. Although the term "Old Tbilisi" has long been used to denote a historical part of the city, it was only in 2007 that it became a distinct administrative entity to incorporate several historical neighbourhoods formerly included in the districts of Mtatsminda-Krtsanisi, Isani-Samgori, and Didube-Chugureti. The district was abolished in 2013, with its territories allotted to several other divisions of the capital.

History 

Old Tbilisi is principally centered on what is commonly referred to as the Tbilisi Historic District, which, due to its significant architectural and urban value, as well as the threat to its survival, was previously listed on the World Monuments Watch (1998, 2000, 2002).

The district is located on both sides of the Kura River and is dominated by Mount Mtatsminda, Narikala fortress and the Kartlis Deda monument. It chiefly represents a 19th-century urban fabric with largely eclectic architecture which includes the buildings and structures from the 5th to the 20th century. However, most of the pre-19th century city did not survive due to the devastating Persian invasion of 1795. The only building that survived is La Residence Castle in Old Town, the only privately owned Castle in Georgia. Once a fortress before the Mongol invasions, it was from the 16th century the residence of the Persian Shah Administrator for eastern Georgia. The district houses a bulk of the tourist attractions in Tbilisi, including churches, museums, sulphur bathhouses, and peculiar wooden houses with open, carved balconies. In the 19th century, the core territory of the modern-day district of Old Tbilisi was tentatively subdivided into ethnic neighborhoods such as Avlabari with its Armenian and Georgian quarters, Alexanderdorf German quarter on the left bank of the Kura River and the Persian Quarter (Said-Abad) on the right bank of the Kura River.

Old Tbilisi has been the centre of a thriving art community with artist Giovanni Vepkhavadze known for specializing in painting many street scenes in the district.

New Life of Old Tbilisi 

In 2010, the government of Tbilisi started a program initiated by Mayor Gigi Ugulava. The idea was to renew old and damaged houses and cobbled streets to make Old Tbilisi more attractive for tourists and visitors.

References 

Pickard, Robert (ed., 2001), Management of Historic Centres, pp. 93–112, 275–286. Taylor & Francis, .
Urban Rehabilitation Policy in Tbilisi (Georgia): Document. prep. by the Technical Co-operation and Consultancy Unit, Directorate of Culture and Cultural and Natural Heritage, Council of Europe Publishing, Strasbourg 2002, .

External links 

Old Tbilisi Official Website
 Old Tbilisi. The Government of Tbilisi.
Tbilisi History Museum. Georgian Art Portal.
Old Tbilisi (vintage photos). Georgian Photographical Heritage Research Center.
 GWS official web page
The Economist, A new look for Old Tbilisi,  
 Old Tbilisi Series of Paintings by Giovanni Vepkhvadze

 
Districts of Tbilisi
World Heritage Tentative List